Mani Charenamei (born 10 February 1959) was a member of the 14th Lok Sabha of India. He represents the Outer Manipur constituency of Manipur.

External links
 Official biographical sketch in Parliament of India website

1959 births
Living people
India MPs 2004–2009
Lok Sabha members from Manipur
People from Senapati district
Independent politicians in India
Manipur politicians